Shoulda Been There, Pt. 1 is the second extended play (EP) by American recording artist Sevyn Streeter. It was released on July 17, 2015 through Atlantic Records in collaboration with CBE. Collaborations feature Chris Brown, Hit-Boy and B.o.B. The extended play was preceded by two singles "Don't Kill the Fun" and "Shoulda Been There".

Shoulda Been There, Pt. 1 debuted at number 4 on the US R&B Albums chart and number 15 on the R&B/Hip-Hop Albums chart.

Background and promotion 
Following the success of Sevyn's debut extended play (EP) Call Me Crazy, But...  Streeter released a teaser trailer for a new single, "Don't Kill the Fun" featuring Chris Brown, on January 8, 2015 and announced that the song would be released on January 13, 2015. On April 28, 2015 Streeter released a statement on her Instagram account about "4th Street" stating "I wrote [it] on a day I found out someone I loved broke my heart into a million pieces. . On July 13, 2015 "Shoulda Been There" featuring B.o.B would be the next single.

On October 3, 2015, it was announced that Streeter would embark on a 7-date tour starting on November 2 in Philadelphia, Pennsylvania and finishing on November 22 in Sacramento, California.

Critical reception
The extended play was met with a positive response from critics. Rap-Up stated "While she readies her debut On the Verge, Sevyn Streeter holds fans over with her new project Shoulda Been There, Pt. 1. ."

Singles 
Don't Kill the Fun featuring Chris Brown was released as the first single on January 13, 2015. The music video was released to Streeter's YouTube channel on February 15, 2015 and directed by Chris Brown. The song charted on the Billboard Twitter Top Tracks chart at number forty-nine, number sixteen on the Hot R&B Songs chart and number nineteen on the R&B/Hip-Hop Airplay chart.

"Shoulda Been There" featuring B.o.B was released as the second single on July 15, 2015. A lyric video was released to Streeter's YouTube channel on July 13, 2015. The song failed to make impact in the United States.

Other songs 
A music video for "Boomerang" featuring Hit-Boy was released to promote "Shoulda Been There, Pt. 1" on September 28, 2015.

Acoustic versions of "Love in Competition" and "Just Being Honest"  were released to Streeter's YouTube channel on January 5, 2016 and February 23, 2016. The video for "Just Being Honest" was directed Rocko Muir.

Tour 
On October 3, 2015 a 7-date tour was announced to promote "Shoulda Been There, Pt. 1" called "Sevyn Streeter Live" starting November 2, 2015 and finishing on November 22, 2015. The tour would feature an intimate performance with discussions about relationships, love, life and everything that inspires her writing while playing songs from her previously released projects. Sevyn will partner up with Music Choice for the L.A. and San Francisco stops to present the “Music Choice Presents: Sound Check Sessions.

Commercial performance 
In the United States, "Shoulda Been There, Pt. 1" debuted at number four on the Billboard R&B Albums chart on August 8, 2015. In its second week the extended play dropped to number seventeen on August 15, 2015. In its third week it dropped to number twenty-five on August 22, 2015 spending a total of three weeks on the chart. It also debuted at number fifteen on the R&B/Hip-Hop Albums chart spending one week on the chart.

Track listing 
Credits taken from Discogs website.

Charts

Release history

References

External links 
 

2015 EPs
Atlantic Records EPs
Albums produced by Da Internz
Albums produced by Dem Jointz
Albums produced by Hit-Boy
Sevyn Streeter albums